Marc Forné i Molné (born 30 December 1946) was the prime minister of Andorra from 7 December 1994 to 20 February 2005. After 2 full terms, he was succeeded by Albert Pintat after Pintat won the January 2005 election. He is a lawyer by profession, and was president of the Liberal Party of Andorra (Partit Liberal d'Andorra).

Biography 
Marc Forné was born on 30 December 1946 in La Massana, the son of Antoni Forné i Jou, an Arfa-born lawyer and activist of the Workers' Party of Marxist Unification, and Joana Molné i Armengou, also born in La Massana.

He studied at the University of Barcelona where he graduated in law in 1974. Between 1969 and 1972, he worked as a civil servant in the Department of Public Services of the General Council of the Valls d'Andorra and from 1974, he worked as a criminal lawyer, sharing an office with his father and brother. In 1985, he joined the Liberal Party of Andorra.

For eleven years, he held the position of director of Andorra-7, a weekly newspaper in the Pyrenees valley that he founded in 1978. He was also the president of the Moto Club of the Principality of Andorra.

Honours 
 : Knight Grand Cross of the Royal Order of Isabella the Catholic (02/06/2006).

References 

1946 births
Living people
People from Andorra la Vella
Heads of Government of Andorra
Liberal Party of Andorra politicians
Knights Grand Cross of the Order of Isabella the Catholic